The 2016 Superettan, part of the 2016 Swedish football season, was the 16th season of Superettan, Sweden's second-tier football league in its current format. The 2016 fixtures were released in December 2015. The season started in April 2016 and ended in November 2016.

Teams
A total of 16 teams contested the league. The top two teams qualified directly for promotion to the Allsvenskan, whilst the third had to play a play-off against the fourteenth-placed team in the Allsvenskan to decide who would play in the 2017 Allsvenskan. The bottom two teams were directly relegated to Division 1, whilst the thirteenth and the fourteenth-placed teams had to play-off against the second-placed teams from Division 1 Södra and Division 1 Norra to decide who would play in the 2017 Superettan.

2015 champions Jönköpings Södra IF and runners-up Östersunds FK were promoted to the Allsvenskan at the end of the 2015 season. They were replaced by Halmstads BK and Åtvidabergs FF. Utsiktens BK and IF Brommapojkarna were relegated at the end of the 2015 season after finishing in the bottom two places of the table. They were replaced by Division 1 Norra champions Dalkurd FF and Division 1 Södra champions Trelleborgs FF. Mjällby AIF was also relegated after losing the relegation play-offs to Division 1 Södra runner-up Örgryte IS.

Stadia and locations

 1 According to each club information page at the Swedish Football Association website for Superettan.

League table

Playoffs
The 13th-placed and 14th-placed teams in the Superettan met the two runners-up from 2016 Division 1 (Norra and Södra) in Two-legged ties on a home-and-away basis with the teams from the Superettan finishing at home.

Norrby IF won 4–2 on aggregate.

Syrianska FC won 5–1 on aggregate.

Positions by round

Season statistics

Top scorers

Top assists

Top goalkeepers
(Minimum of 10 games played)

Hat-tricks

References

External links 
  

Superettan seasons
2
Sweden
Sweden